The 1746 English cricket season was the third season following the earliest known codification of the Laws of Cricket.

Matches 
Details of 12 matches between significant teams are recorded. The crowd at the Surrey and Kent versus Addington and Bromley match on 7 July was reported as "nearly ten thousand".

12 May – Bromley v Addington – Bromley Common
19 May – Addington v Bromley – Artillery Ground
9 June – Addington & Lingfield v London & Surrey – Artillery Ground
23 June – Kent v Surrey – Artillery Ground
2 July – London v Westminster – Artillery Ground
7 July – Kent & Surrey v Addington & Bromley – Duppas Hill, Croydon
14 July – Addington & Bromley v Kent & Surrey – Artillery Ground
30 July – London v Edmonton – Artillery Ground
2 August – Kent v England – Bromley Common
4 August – England v Kent – Artillery Ground
25 August – London v Edmonton – Artillery Ground
1 September – Chislehurst & London v Addington – Artillery Ground

Single wicket
A four-a-side match was played at the Artillery Ground on 21 July between Four Millers of Bray Mills in Berkshire and Four Best Players of Addington and on 6 August a three-a-side match was played on the same ground between "six players esteemed the best in England". The teams were Robert Colchin, John Bryant (both Bromley) and Joe Harris (Addington) playing against Stephen Dingate (Surrey), Val Romney (Sevenoaks) and Richard Newland (Slindon). Dingate's team won the match over which hundreds of pounds were wagered.

First mentions

Clubs and teams
 Chislehurst & London
 Edmonton

References

Bibliography

Further reading
 
 
 
 
 
 

1746 in English cricket
English cricket seasons in the 18th century